Beach handball at the 2012 Asian Beach Games was held from 16 June to 22 June 2012 in Zone A of Fengxiang Beach, Haiyang, China.

Medalists

Medal table

Results

Men

Preliminary round

Group A

|-
|16 Jun
|09:00
|align=right|
|align=center|0–2
|align=left|
|14–15||10–13||
|-
|17 Jun
|09:00
|align=right|
|align=center|1–2
|align=left|
|14–16||18–15||4–5
|-
|17 Jun
|14:00
|align=right|
|align=center|2–0
|align=left|
|32–18||25–24||
|-
|18 Jun
|09:00
|align=right|
|align=center|0–2
|align=left|
|15–17||13–15||
|-
|18 Jun
|14:00
|align=right|
|align=center|2–1
|align=left|
|17–22||18–17||9–8
|-
|19 Jun
|10:00
|align=right|
|align=center|1–2
|align=left|
|16–18||13–12||6–9
|}

Group B

|-
|16 Jun
|09:00
|align=right|
|align=center|0–2
|align=left|
|10–29||12–26||
|-
|16 Jun
|11:00
|align=right|
|align=center|2–0
|align=left|
|18–10||23–3||
|-
|17 Jun
|10:00
|align=right|
|align=center|2–0
|align=left|
|30–11||21–8||
|-
|17 Jun
|10:00
|align=right|
|align=center|2–0
|align=left|
|8–6||12–9||
|-
|17 Jun
|15:00
|align=right|
|align=center|2–0
|align=left|
|22–8||21–18||
|-
|17 Jun
|16:00
|align=right|
|align=center|0–2
|align=left|
|7–22||4–14||
|-
|18 Jun
|09:00
|align=right|
|align=center|1–2
|align=left|
|17–21||16–15||6–9
|-
|18 Jun
|15:00
|align=right|
|align=center|0–2
|align=left|
|10–19||11–20||
|-
|19 Jun
|10:00
|align=right|
|align=center|0–2
|align=left|
|15–19||13–18||
|-
|19 Jun
|11:00
|align=right|
|align=center|0–2
|align=left|
|7–19||12–14||
|}

Group C

|-
|16 Jun
|10:00
|align=right|
|align=center|2–0
|align=left|
|21–5||24–7||
|-
|16 Jun
|11:00
|align=right|
|align=center|0–2
|align=left| Independent Olympic Athletes
|10–21||18–23||
|-
|17 Jun
|09:00
|align=right|
|align=center|0–2
|align=left|
|13–18||12–16||
|-
|17 Jun
|10:00
|align=right|Independent Olympic Athletes 
|align=center|2–0
|align=left|
|16–4||23–9||
|-
|17 Jun
|15:00
|align=right|
|align=center|2–0
|align=left|
|27–10||21–10||
|-
|17 Jun
|16:00
|align=right|
|align=center|0–2
|align=left|
|8–10||12–14||
|-
|18 Jun
|09:00
|align=right|
|align=center|0–2
|align=left| Independent Olympic Athletes
|10–16||17–20||
|-
|18 Jun
|10:00
|align=right|
|align=center|2–0
|align=left|
|19–12||21–10||
|-
|18 Jun
|16:00
|align=right|
|align=center|2–0
|align=left|
|18–16||14–13||
|-
|18 Jun
|17:00
|align=right|Independent Olympic Athletes 
|align=center|2–1
|align=left|
|12–17||20–11||6–4
|}

Match for 13/14

|-
|20 Jun
|09:00
|align=right|
|align=center|2–1
|align=left|
|14–17||14–8||7–6
|}

2nd round

Group D

|-
|20 Jun
|10:00
|align=right|Independent Olympic Athletes 
|align=center|0–2
|align=left|
|15–18||16–19||
|-
|20 Jun
|14:00
|align=right|
|align=center|2–1
|align=left| Independent Olympic Athletes
|20–12||13–16||8–6
|-
|20 Jun
|16:00
|align=right|
|align=center|2–1
|align=left|
|11–12||22–21||10–8
|}

Group E

|-
|20 Jun
|10:00
|align=right|
|align=center|2–0
|align=left|
|20–11||19–14||
|-
|20 Jun
|14:00
|align=right|
|align=center|2–0
|align=left|
|16–14||13–12||
|-
|20 Jun
|16:00
|align=right|
|align=center|0–2
|align=left|
|4–26||15–21||
|}

Group F

|-
|20 Jun
|09:00
|align=right|
|align=center|1–2
|align=left|
|20–23||23–22||2–5
|-
|20 Jun
|11:00
|align=right|
|align=center|0–2
|align=left|
|9–16||6–16||
|-
|20 Jun
|15:00
|align=right|
|align=center|2–0
|align=left|
|27–10||21–6||
|}

Group G

|-
|20 Jun
|09:00
|align=right|
|align=center|0–2
|align=left|
|15–19||17–18||
|-
|20 Jun
|11:00
|align=right|
|align=center|0–2
|align=left|
|19–21||12–14||
|-
|20 Jun
|15:00
|align=right|
|align=center|2–0
|align=left|
|25–11||20–19||
|}

Match for 11/12

|-
|21 Jun
|09:00
|align=right|
|align=center|2–0
|align=left|
|18–14||10–6||
|}

Classification 7–10

Semifinals for 7–10

|-
|21 Jun
|09:00
|align=right|
|align=center|2–0
|align=left|
|21–14||16–14||
|-
|21 Jun
|09:00
|align=right|
|align=center|2–0
|align=left|
|21–19||20–18||
|}

Match for 9/10

|-
|21 Jun
|11:00
|align=right|
|align=center|0–2
|align=left|
|13–16||13–15||
|}

Match for 7/8

|-
|21 Jun
|11:00
|align=right|
|align=center|2–1
|align=left|
|21–23||20–12||6–4
|}

Match for 5/6

|-
|21 Jun
|10:00
|align=right|Independent Olympic Athletes 
|align=center|2–1
|align=left|
|12–11||12–13||10–8
|}

Final round

Semifinals

|-
|21 Jun
|16:00
|align=right|
|align=center|1–2
|align=left|
|14–16||22–16||6–9
|-
|21 Jun
|17:00
|align=right|
|align=center|2–0
|align=left|
|20–13||12–11||
|}

Bronze medal match

|-
|22 Jun
|11:00
|align=right|
|align=center|1–2
|align=left|
|16–13||9–12||14–16
|}

Gold medal match

|-
|22 Jun
|12:00
|align=right|
|align=center|0–2
|align=left|
|12–14||18–24||
|}

Women

Preliminary round

Group A

|-
|16 Jun
|09:00
|align=right|
|align=center|2–1
|align=left|
|9–7||4–8||4–0
|-
|16 Jun
|10:00
|align=right|
|align=center|0–2
|align=left|
|10–13||13–16||
|-
|17 Jun
|11:00
|align=right|
|align=center|2–0
|align=left|
|17–12||20–9||
|-
|17 Jun
|17:00
|align=right|
|align=center|0–2
|align=left|
|16–17||6–7||
|-
|17 Jun
|17:00
|align=right|
|align=center|0–2
|align=left|
|10–16||10–11||
|-
|18 Jun
|11:00
|align=right|
|align=center|0–2
|align=left|
|6–15||9–21||
|-
|18 Jun
|16:00
|align=right|
|align=center|0–2
|align=left|
|9–11||6–20||
|-
|18 Jun
|17:00
|align=right|
|align=center|0–2
|align=left|
|4–14||11–13||
|-
|19 Jun
|09:00
|align=right|
|align=center|2–1
|align=left|
|8–11||16–13||9–7
|-
|19 Jun
|10:00
|align=right|
|align=center|2–0
|align=left|
|13–12||13–10||
|}

Group B

|-
|16 Jun
|10:00
|align=right|
|align=center|2–0
|align=left|
|17–2||21–9||
|-
|17 Jun
|09:00
|align=right|
|align=center|2–0
|align=left|
|15–14||15–8||
|-
|17 Jun
|15:00
|align=right|
|align=center|2–0
|align=left|
|18–6||17–3||
|-
|17 Jun
|16:00
|align=right|
|align=center|0–2
|align=left|
|9–10||7–11||
|-
|18 Jun
|10:00
|align=right|
|align=center|0–2
|align=left|
|5–17||6–21||
|-
|18 Jun
|11:00
|align=right|
|align=center|0–2
|align=left|
|6–11||7–14||
|-
|18 Jun
|15:00
|align=right|
|align=center|0–2
|align=left|
|13–20||8–20||
|-
|18 Jun
|16:00
|align=right|
|align=center|2–0
|align=left|
|22–5||26–6||
|-
|19 Jun
|09:00
|align=right|
|align=center|2–0
|align=left|
|19–6||20–11||
|-
|19 Jun
|09:00
|align=right|
|align=center|2–0
|align=left|
|21–6||19–18||
|}

Match for 9/10

|-
|20 Jun
|10:00
|align=right|
|align=center|2–0
|align=left|
|28–11||12–11||
|}

Classification 5–8

Semifinals for 5–8

|-
|20 Jun
|14:00
|align=right|
|align=center|2–0
|align=left|
|17–10||10–8||
|-
|20 Jun
|15:00
|align=right|
|align=center|1–2
|align=left|
|11–12||16–14||8–10
|}

Match for 7/8

|-
|21 Jun
|10:00
|align=right|
|align=center|2–1
|align=left|
|10–11||16–12||4–1
|}

Match for 5/6

|-
|21 Jun
|10:00
|align=right|
|align=center|1–2
|align=left|
|11–9||10–12||6–8
|}

Final round

Semifinals

|-
|21 Jun
|14:00
|align=right|
|align=center|2–1
|align=left|
|20–14||18–19||8–6
|-
|21 Jun
|15:00
|align=right|
|align=center|2–0
|align=left|
|15–8||16–9||
|}

Bronze medal match

|-
|22 Jun
|09:00
|align=right|
|align=center|1–2
|align=left|
|11–12||13–12||4–7
|}

Gold medal match

|-
|22 Jun
|10:00
|align=right|
|align=center|0–2
|align=left|
|11–18||12–19||
|}

References
 Official website

2012 Asian Beach Games events
2012 in handball
2012